Yang Hengyu (b. 1996) is a Chinese fencer.

Hengyu began fencing her third year of primary school. She is right-handed, and a sabreuse.

2020 Tokyo Olympics 
She was one of 406 Chinese athletes chosen to compete in the 2020 Tokyo Summer Olympics. She finished 16th in the Women's Sabre Individual event ater being defeated by Sofia Pozdniakova 7th competing as part of the Women's Sabre Team.

References 

Living people
1996 births
Chinese sabre fencers
Fencing at the 2020 Summer Olympics
Fencers at the 2018 Asian Games
Asian Games silver medalists for China
Asian Games medalists in fencing
Medalists at the 2018 Asian Games
Olympic fencers of China
20th-century Chinese women
21st-century Chinese women